Brian De Keersmaecker (born 6 May 2000) is a Belgian professional footballer who plays as a midfielder for Dutch club FC Eindhoven.

Club career
De Keersmaecker made his professional debut with Beerschot in a Europa League Playoff 2–0 win over K.A.S. Eupen on 13 April 2020, scoring immediately in his debut. On 2 May 2019, De Keersmaecker signed his first professional contract with Beerschot.

He was sent on a one-season loan to Dutch second-tier Eerste Divisie club FC Eindhoven on 5 October 2020. In May 2021 Beerschot decided not to renew his contract, making him a free agent in July.

On 4 June 2021 he moved to Eindhoven on a permanent basis and signed a two-year contract.

References

External links
 
 SFL Profile
 Beerschot Profile
 ACFF Profile

2000 births
People from Bornem
Living people
Belgian footballers
Belgian expatriate footballers
Belgium youth international footballers
Association football midfielders
K Beerschot VA players
Club Brugge KV players
FC Eindhoven players
Belgian Pro League players
Challenger Pro League players
Eerste Divisie players
Belgian expatriate sportspeople in the Netherlands
Expatriate footballers in the Netherlands
Footballers from Antwerp Province